Chris Hurley may refer to:

 Chris Hurley (police officer), Queensland police officer involved in the 2004 Palm Island death in custody
 Chris Hurley (footballer) (born 1943), English former footballer